Pablo Mackenna Dörr (born May 30, 1969) is a Chilean television presenter, writer and poet. He was a host of the Chilean version of television show CQC.

Biography
Mackenna was born in Santiago, the son of the businessman Luis Fernando Mackenna Echaurren, of Irish descent and María Teresa Dörr Zegers, of German descent. Is the third of eight children. Studied at Colegio Tabancura school and later Economy at Pontificia Universidad Católica de Chile and Philosophy at Heidelberg University, Germany. In 1994, Mackenna worked at the Santiago Stock Exchange (Bolsa de Comercio de Santiago).

Joined his television career in 2002, hosting the Chilean version of the television show called CQC. After in 2007 was host of the TV show "La Liga" along with Rafael Cavada, Blanca Lewin and Roka Valbuena. In 2008 with the journalist Felipe Bianchi, Pablo animated a radio talk show named "Vueltas del Universo" by Radio Universo. And in 2009 was part of the reality show 1910 as the host with Raquel Argandoña.

Personal life
In 2006, Pablo Mackenna married the actress Javiera Díaz de Valdés and in 2008 born their first child, Rosa. During 2009, they finished their relationship. In 2006 published his book "Cuarenta Noches".

References

1969 births
21st-century Chilean poets
21st-century Chilean male writers
Chilean male poets
Chilean television presenters
Chilean people of Irish descent
Chilean people of German descent
Living people
People from Santiago
Pablo